Presidential elections were held in Iran on 28 July 1989, after the death of Ayatollah Ruhollah Khomeini and the selection of Ayatollah Ali Khamenei, the previous President of Iran, as the new Supreme Leader of Iran. Out of the seventy-nine candidates registered to run, only two were approved by the Council of Guardians, which resulted in a very predictable win by Akbar Hashemi Rafsanjani, the previous Speaker of Majlis.

The Iranian constitution was amended by referendum on the same day.

Candidates

Disqualified candidates 
The Guardian Council disqualified some candidates who enrolled to run for president, including:
 Ebrahim Yazdi,  Head of Political Bureau of Freedom Movement of Iran

Results

References

Presidential elections in Iran
1989 elections in Iran
Iran